Quaderni Rossi (Italian:Red Notebooks) was an Italian political journal founded in 1961 which became one of the primary sources of autonomist Marxism. The first issue appeared on 30 September 1961. Raniero Panzieri played a central role in founding the journal alongside Mario Tronti, Romano Alquati, Antonio (Toni) Negri, Alberto Asor Rosa, and Danilo Montaldi. In August 1963, Classe Operaia, led by Tronti, broke away, leaving a group around Panzieri and Vittorio Rieser running Quaderni Rossi. Following the death of Panzieri in 1964, the journal continued until 1966 but without the same impact as it had previously enjoyed.

References

External links
 Quaderni Rossi Excerpt from Storming Heaven (2002).

1961 establishments in Italy
1966 disestablishments in Italy
Defunct political magazines published in Italy
Italian-language magazines
Marxist magazines
Magazines established in 1961
Magazines disestablished in 1966